Ćwikielnia  is a settlement in the administrative district of Gmina Stawiguda, within Olsztyn County, Warmian-Masurian Voivodeship, in northern Poland. It is located in Warmia.

Before 1772 the area was part of Kingdom of Poland, 1772–1871 Prussia, 1871–1945 Germany, and again Poland since 1945.

References

Villages in Olsztyn County